Nelson Mandela is a bronze sculpture in Parliament Square, London, of former President of South Africa and anti-apartheid activist Nelson Mandela.  Originally proposed to Mandela by Donald Woods in 2001, a fund was set up and led by Woods's wife and Lord Richard Attenborough after the death of Woods.  The then Mayor of London Ken Livingstone obtained permission from Westminster City Council to locate the statue on the north terrace of Trafalgar Square, but after an appeal it was located in Parliament Square instead where it was unveiled on 29 August 2007.

Description
The plinth the statue stands on is shorter than the other statues located in Parliament Square. It was created by English sculptor Ian Walters, at a cost of £400,000. Walters had previously created the bust of Mandela located on the South Bank in London. Fellow sculptor Glyn Williams criticised the statue at a public inquiry during the planning process, saying that it is "an adequate portrait but nothing more".

History
Donald Woods originally proposed the idea of a statue of Nelson Mandela for London; the fundraising to create the statue was led by his wife and Lord Richard Attenborough after his death.  Woods gained approval from Mandela in 2001, with the original idea to site the statue on a fifth plinth to be located outside the High Commission of South Africa in Trafalgar Square.  The fund was officially launched at London's City Hall on 24 March 2003.

In 2004, Mayor of London Ken Livingstone publicly pledged his support for a statue of Nelson Mandela for Trafalgar Square at a celebration in the square of the 10th anniversary of democracy in South Africa. "It will be a square of two Nelsons. The man up there, his battle of Trafalgar was the defining battle that paved the way for 100 years of British empire, and Nelson Mandela looking down on this square will symbolise the peaceful transition to a world without empires." Westminster City Council turned down the planning application to position the statue in the square's north terrace near the National Gallery on the grounds that it would impede events in the area and would end the symmetrical layout of that part of the square. The Mayor appealed to the office of the Deputy Prime Minister, which agreed with the council's decision. However the Deputy Prime Minister stated that he supported the location of the statue on an alternative site, while the council suggested placing the statue outside the High Commission of South Africa along the side of the square. The Liberal Democrats of the London Assembly later criticised the use of £100,000 by the London Mayor to appeal Westminster Council's decision, saying that "Thousands of pounds of taxpayers money is set to be wasted in these costly arguments."

In April 2007, Westminster City Council completed a further review of possible locations for the statue. It was decided to locate the statue in Parliament Square alongside the statues of other important figures including Abraham Lincoln, Benjamin Disraeli, Jan Smuts, and Churchill.  The statue was unveiled by British Prime Minister Gordon Brown on 29 August 2007, in a ceremony held in Parliament Square.  Among the attendees were Mandela, his wife Graça Machel, and Livingstone.  In a speech, Mandela said that it fulfilled a dream for there to be a statue of a black man in Parliament Square.

The statue was temporarily covered up in June 2020 after protesters defaced a statue of Winston Churchill, attempted to vandalise The Cenotaph in London, and pulled down a statue of Edward Colston was in Bristol during the Black Lives Matter protests. Far-right group Britain First called for the statue of Mandela to be "torn down".

See also
 Statue of Nelson Mandela, Johannesburg
 Statue of Nelson Mandela, Balcony Cape Town City Hall overlooking the Grand Parade

References

External links

 Transcript of Nelson Mandela's speech at the unveiling – NelsonMandela.org

2007 sculptures
Bronze sculptures in the United Kingdom
Monuments and memorials in London
London, Parliament Square
Outdoor sculptures in London
Parliament Square
Mandela, Nelson
Mandela